6066 aluminium alloy is an aluminium alloy used in forgings and extrusion for welded structures.

References

External links
 Behaviour of Artificial Aging in 6066 Alloy Using 

Aluminium alloys
Aluminium–magnesium–silicon alloys

Aluminum alloy table